The Noise Made by People is the debut studio album by English indie electronic band Broadcast. It was released on 20 March 2000 by Warp. The band recorded and produced the album themselves after being dissatisfied with the results of earlier recording sessions helmed by external engineers.

Two singles were released from The Noise Made by People; "Echo's Answer" on 1 November 1999 and "Come On Let's Go" on 22 May 2000.

Composition 
Pitchfork critic Claire Lobenfeld described the style of The Noise Made by People as a homage of 1960s psychedelic pop; meanwhile, Carlene Bauer of Salon characterised it as "electronic, but not shot full of skittering beats", noting Broadcast's approach of fusing "synthesized sounds and live instrumentation". Writing for The Washington Post, Mark Jenkins said that the album "combines dub atmospherics, sample-driven audio collage and Trish Keenan's icy vocals in the manner of Portishead."

Critical reception 

The Noise Made by People received critical acclaim. Awarding it a full score of five stars, AllMusic's Heather Phares called the album "shimmering, weightless pop" that "delivers [Broadcast]'s sound in widescreen, filmic grandeur." Pitchforks Dan Gardopée appluaded it as "positively vibrant and alive."

Pitchfork placed The Noise Made by People at number 177 on its list of the best albums of the 2000s, and "Echo's Answer" at number 178 on its list of the best tracks of the 1990s.

Legacy 
In 2014, Vices Billy Black hailed The Noise Made by People as Warp's most representative release. Lauding its "untouchable otherness", Black wrote that it helped pave paths for "accessible" experimental music in the future. Stereogums Nate Patrin wrote an essay on the album in response to its 20th anniversary, crediting it with introducing a "more sophisticated, less caricatured" psychedelia style to the new millennium.

Track listing

Personnel 
Credits are adapted from the album's liner notes.

 Broadcast – engineering, mixing, recording
 Stephen Francis – mixing (tracks 2, 5, 7, 8, 10, 12)
 Paul Glave – engineering (tracks 8, 10, 12)
 House – artwork, photography
 Kenny Patterson – engineering (track 11)
 Steve Perkins – drums (tracks 8, 11, 12)
 Keith York – drums (tracks 2–4, 6, 7, 9)

Charts

Release history

References

External links 
 
 

2000 debut albums
Broadcast (band) albums
Warp (record label) albums
Tommy Boy Records albums